Sílvio Antônio (born 26 May 1974), known as Silvinho, is a Brazilian retired footballer who played as a forward.

Career
After scoring five goals with Sociedade Esportiva Matonense as the club won the 1997 Campeonato Paulista Série A2, Silvinho joined Clube Atlético Paranaense for the 1997 Campeonato Brasileiro Série A. He scored on his debut, a 2–1 win over Goiás. Silvinho returned to Atlético-PR to play in the 1999 Campeonato Paranaense.

References

External links
 Silvinho at Kickersarchiv.de 

1978 births
Living people
Brazilian footballers
Brazilian expatriate footballers
União São João Esporte Clube players
Club Athletico Paranaense players
Grêmio Foot-Ball Porto Alegrense players
Associação Desportiva São Caetano players
FC Wil players
Ituano FC players
Stuttgarter Kickers players
Avaí FC players
Esporte Clube Noroeste players
Campeonato Brasileiro Série A players
2. Bundesliga players
Expatriate footballers in Switzerland
Expatriate footballers in Germany
People from Araraquara
Association football forwards
Footballers from São Paulo (state)